Matt Higgins (born  1974) is an American businessman, author, and the co-founder and CEO of RSE Ventures, a private investment firm that focuses on sports and entertainment, media and marketing, food and lifestyle, and technology. In 2012, Higgins co-founded RSE with Stephen M. Ross, the founder of Related Companies and owner of the Miami Dolphins. Higgins served as Vice Chairman of the Dolphins from 2012-2021, having previously been a high-level executive with the New York Jets. His first book, Burn the Boats: Toss Plan B Overboard and Unleash Your Full Potential will be published by William Morrow in 2023.

Early life
Higgins was born in Flushing and grew up in the Bayside neighborhood of Queens, New York City. He is of Irish descent. After growing up in abject poverty and taking care of his ailing mother, Higgins decided to drop out of high school at age 16, obtain his equivalency diploma and enroll at Queens College, where he took night classes and graduated with a political science degree. He started his career as an award-winning investigative reporter at the Queens Tribune and attended Fordham University School of Law at night, while working for Mayor Rudolph W. Giuliani as the youngest press secretary in New York City history.

Career
Higgins is the CEO and co-founder of RSE Ventures, a company that has invested in various companies and technologies, including: FanVision, the handheld device that is the official in-venue content provider of NASCAR, Thuzio, the project of former NFL running back Tiki Barber and Mark Gerson of Gerson Lehrman Group, and the Drone Racing League, the world's first professional drone racing circuit. RSE Ventures also incubated and invested in restaurant reservation app Resy, which American Express acquired in 2019. In 2016, Higgins negotiated a deal to have RSE Ventures become a minority stakeholder in Momofuku. In 2017, he also negotiated RSE Ventures' funding of Milk Bar (launched in 2008 as part of Momofuku) and D.C.-based fast-casual pizza chain &pizza's national expansion. In 2018, RSE acquired cybersecurity company SkOUT Secure Intelligence and acquired a significant minority stake in Australian-style coffee and café business Bluestone Lane.

Along with these investments, Higgins and RSE have launched several companies, including public relations firm Derris and Insignia in 2012 (now Ascendent Sports Group), and the International Champions Cup soccer tournament in 2013. RSE Ventures also partnered with Gary Vaynerchuk in 2014 to form VaynerRSE, a $25 million seed fund and incubator.

Higgins was the vice chairman of the Miami Dolphins from 2012-2021, serving as an advisor to owner Stephen M. Ross. Higgins helped hire Mike Tannenbaum, the Dolphins' executive vice president of football operations. Prior to the Dolphins, Higgins worked for the New York Jets from 2004 to 2012, serving as the executive vice president of business operations and close advisor to Jets owner Woody Johnson. Higgins was instrumental in helping the team build MetLife Stadium with the New York Giants, building a new training facility in Florham Park, and using Twitter, Facebook and a revamped website for fans to have better access to the team.

Before his career with the Jets, Higgins was COO of the Lower Manhattan Development Corporation, the firm tasked with rebuilding the site of the World Trade Center. He also served as press secretary under Mayor Rudolph W. Giuliani, managing the global media response to the September 11 attacks in 2001 for New York City.

Beginning in 2018, Higgins has appeared as a guest investor on the series Shark Tank. He was part of a five-Shark investment in the Cup Board Pro, the product of late FDNY firefighter Keith Young, whose children pitched the product after he died from 9/11-related cancer. The Sharks pledged to invest any profits into a charity that will benefit firefighters suffering from 9/11-related illnesses.

Recognition
In 2007, Higgins was recognized by Crain's New York as one of the top 40 executives under 40 in New York. Four years later, Sports Business Journal selected him in their "40 under 40" list as one of the most outstanding executives in sports. In 2015, Forbes listed RSE Ventures as one of the 10 best organizations to work for in sports. In February 2017, RSE Ventures portfolio companies Resy and Drone Racing League were named to Fast Company's World's Most Innovative Companies 2017 list, and in 2018, portfolio company &pizza was named to the list. In 2019 Higgins joined the ranks of former U.S. presidents, Nobel Prize winners and CEOs when he was awarded the Ellis Island Medal of Honor. The award recognizes individuals who have made it their mission to share their wealth of knowledge, courage, compassion, unique talents and selfless generosity with those less fortunate.

Personal life
Higgins is a board member of Autism Speaks and an avid runner. He is also a testicular cancer survivor, which he successfully treated in 2007. In 2011, he ran the ING marathon to help raise money for autism. Higgins received a bachelor's degree from Queens College and a juris doctor from the Fordham University School of Law in 2002.

In 2016, he urged fellow Republicans to cast their vote for Hillary Clinton – arguing that the ″preservation of the republic″ is more important than ″taxation and anything else″.

In 2019, he delivered the commencement address at his alma mater Queens College, where he established the Linda Higgins Empowerment Scholarship to help support single parents in obtaining college degrees, in honor of his late mother. According to Vanity Fair Contributing Editor Paul Goldberger, "This is a magnificent and truly inspiring speech that everyone should read. If you think commencement speeches are made of cliches, this one will change your mind. To me it belongs in the same category as David Foster Wallace’s great speech at Kenyon College commencement in 2005."

References

Year of birth missing (living people)
Living people
American people of Irish descent
Businesspeople from Queens, New York
Fordham University School of Law alumni
People from Bayside, Queens
People from Queens, New York
Queens College, City University of New York alumni